Ivo Mammini (born 15 April 2003) is an Argentine professional footballer who plays as a centre-forward for Gimnasia La Plata.

Career
Mammini began with local side Club VRADI, before signing with Gimnasia y Esgrima in 2012. He spent the next eight years progressing through their youth system, which culminated with the centre-forward netting over fifty goals between 2017 and 2020. Mammini was promoted into the first-team in January 2020 under manager Diego Maradona. His senior debut arrived on 25 February in a Copa Argentina round of sixty-four victory over Sportivo Barracas, as he replaced Horacio Tijanovich for the final few minutes against Primera D Metropolitana opposition. He signed his first professional contract in the succeeding June.

Career statistics
.

Notes

References

External links

2003 births
Living people
Footballers from La Plata
Argentine footballers
Association football forwards
Argentine Primera División players
Club de Gimnasia y Esgrima La Plata footballers